Ralph Benjamin Pond (May 4, 1888 – September 8, 1947) was an American professional baseball outfielder who played briefly for the Boston Red Sox during the  season. Pond threw right-handed (batting side unknown). A native of Eau Claire, Wisconsin, he attended the University of Maine, where he played college baseball for the Black Bears from 1909–1910.

Pond  was a major leaguer whose career, statistically speaking, was only slightly different from that of Moonlight Graham. On June 8, 1910, he started at center field for Boston in a 5–4 defeat to the Chicago White Sox at South Side Park. He hit a single in four at-bats and stole one base, while committing an error in his only fielding chance. After that, he never appeared in a major league game again.

Pond died at the age of 59 in Cleveland, Ohio.

See also
Cup of coffee

References

External links

Retrosheet
June 8, 1910 game

1888 births
1947 deaths
Boston Red Sox players
Major League Baseball center fielders
Maine Black Bears baseball players
Baseball players from Wisconsin
Sportspeople from Eau Claire, Wisconsin
Brockton Shoemakers players
Providence Grays (minor league) players